Terhune-Hopper House may refer to either of two distinct NRHP-listed houses:

Terhune–Hopper House (Ho-Ho-Kus, New Jersey), listed on the National Register of Historic Places in Bergen County, New Jersey
Terhune–Hopper House (Upper Saddle River, New Jersey), listed on the National Register of Historic Places in Bergen County, New Jersey